Sergei Leonidovich Rozhkov (born 1 April 1972) is a former Russian biathlete.

Biathlon results
All results are sourced from the International Biathlon Union.

Olympic Games

*Mass start was added as an event in 2006.

World Championships
7 medals (1 gold, 5 silver, 1 bronze)

*During Olympic seasons competitions are only held for those events not included in the Olympic program.
**Team was removed as an event in 1998, and pursuit was added in 1997 with mass start being added in 1999 and the mixed relay in 2005.

Individual victories
4 victories (2 In, 2 Sp)

*Results are from UIPMB and IBU races which include the Biathlon World Cup, Biathlon World Championships and the Winter Olympic Games.

References

External links
 

1972 births
Living people
People from Murmansk
Russian male biathletes
Biathletes at the 2002 Winter Olympics
Biathletes at the 2006 Winter Olympics
Olympic biathletes of Russia
Biathlon World Championships medalists
Sportspeople from Murmansk Oblast
21st-century Russian people
20th-century Russian people